Thalassophonea is an extinct clade of pliosaurids from the Middle Jurassic to the early Late Cretaceous (Callovian to Turonian) of Australia, Europe, North America and South America. Thalassophonea was erected by Roger Benson and Patrick Druckenmiller in 2013. The name is derived from Greek thalassa (θάλασσα), "sea", and phoneus (φονεύς), "murderer". It is a stem-based taxon defined as "all taxa more closely related to Pliosaurus brachydeirus than to Marmornectes candrewi". It includes the short necked and large headed taxa that typify the family.

Classification 
The following cladogram follows an analysis by Benson & Druckenmiller (2014).
<div class="noprint">

References

External links 
 

Middle Jurassic first appearances
Cretaceous plesiosaurs
Jurassic plesiosaurs
Turonian extinctions
Mesozoic reptiles of Australia
Plesiosaurs of Europe
Plesiosaurs of North America
Plesiosaurs of South America
Fossil taxa described in 2013